Columbus Catholic High School is a private, Roman Catholic high school in Marshfield, Wisconsin.  It is located in the Roman Catholic Diocese of La Crosse.

Background
Columbus Catholic High School is one of two Catholic high schools in Wood County.

Starting with the 2012–2013 school year, Columbus Catholic High School administrators and teachers began a one-to-one iPad integration.

Notable alumni
 Rich Seubert - NFL player for the New York Giants

References

External links
 School website

Roman Catholic Diocese of La Crosse
Catholic secondary schools in Wisconsin
Schools in Wood County, Wisconsin